"Wake Up Call" is a double A-side 2003 single release by English drummer Phil Collins from his seventh solo album Testify, released in 2002. The song was released in a double A-side format alongside "The Least You Can Do".

The music video made for "Wake Up Call", showed Collins waking early and going around Geneva giving a wake-up call to local residents. Before long, a crowd gathers to follow him and starts to pester him with questions, of which the last question enquires about a possible Genesis reunion, to which Collins shakes his head and makes a funny face. However, he did re-unite with the band in 2007 for Turn It On Again: The Tour. The question about the reunion was meant to be asked by Tony Smith, the manager of both Phil Collins and Genesis, but when he refused to appear on camera, it posed by the video's producer, Paul Flattery. Flattery and his director/partner Jim Yukich had made virtually all the videos, concert films and television specials for both Phil and Genesis since the early eighties.

The song failed to make a huge impact on the charts, suffering from the poor reception Testify received upon release.

Track listing
UK single
"The Least You Can Do" – 4:23
"Wake Up Call" – 4:14
"Hey, Now Sunshine" – 5:02

European single
"Wake Up Call" – 4:14
"Tears of a Clown" – 3:25
"Hey, Now Sunshine" – 5:02

Credits

"Wake Up Call"
 All instruments played by Phil Collins except:
 Tim Pierce – guitars
 James Sanger – additional programming
 Arranged by Phil Collins and Daryl Stuermer

Charts

Notes

References

2003 singles
Phil Collins songs
Songs written by Phil Collins
Song recordings produced by Rob Cavallo
Atlantic Records singles